Linda femorata is a species of beetle in the family Cerambycidae. It was described by Chevrolat in 1852, originally under the genus Amphionycha.

Varietas
 Linda femorata var. rufifrons Breuning, 1954
 Linda femorata var. melanoptera Fairmaire, 1895

References

femorata
Beetles described in 1852